Rutherglen South is one of the 20 electoral wards of South Lanarkshire Council. Created in 2007, the ward elects three councillors using the single transferable vote electoral system and covers an area with a population of 15,322 people.

The ward has politically been split between Labour, the Liberal Democrats and the Scottish National Party (SNP) with each party returning one councillor at each full election. Labour briefly held two of the three seats following a by-election in 2013.

Boundaries
The ward was created following the Fourth Statutory Reviews of Electoral Arrangements ahead of the 2007 Scottish local elections. As a result of the Local Governance (Scotland) Act 2004, local elections in Scotland would use the single transferable vote electoral system from 2007 onwards so Rutherglen South was formed from an amalgamation of several previous first-past-the-post wards. It contained the majority of the former Stonelaw ward, roughly half of the former Cathkin/Springhall ward and all of the former Fernhill and Spittal/Blairbeth wards as well as a small part of the former Bankhead ward. Rutherglen South covers a suburban area in the south of Rutherglen including the neighbourhoods of Burnside, Blairbeth, Cathkin, Fernhill, High Burnside, Springhall and Spittal. The ward's western boundary is the long-established division with Glasgow City Council.

Prior to the local government reforms in the 1990s, Rutherglen was within the Glasgow District under Strathclyde Regional Council. One of its single-member wards was Fernhill, which included much of the same area as the current Rutherglen South, with the exception of the parts of Burnside north of the Cathcart Circle Line railway tracks.

Following the Fifth Statutory Reviews of Electoral Arrangements ahead of the 2017 Scottish local elections, streets around Overtoun Park, Dryburgh Avenue and Limeside Avenue were transferred from the ward into Rutherglen Central and North while streets to the east of the ward around East Kilbride Road, Brownside Road and Dukes Road were transferred into Rutherglen South from Cambuslang West.

Councillors

Election Results

2022 election

2017 election

2013 by-election

2012 election

2007 election

Notes

References

Wards of South Lanarkshire
Rutherglen